Glan Pibwr Stream Section is a Site of Special Scientific Interest in Carmarthen & Dinefwr,  Wales. Datasets for various species associated with this area, under a variety of designations, are available.

See also
List of Sites of Special Scientific Interest in Carmarthen & Dinefwr

References

Sites of Special Scientific Interest in Carmarthen & Dinefwr